Orithales is a genus of beetles belonging to the family Elateridae.

The species of this genus are found in Europe.

Species:
 Orithales serraticornis (Paykull, 1800)

References

Elateridae
Elateridae genera